Kosiv is a city located in Ivano-Frankivsk Oblast, in western Ukraine. It is the administrative center of Kosiv Raion (district). Kosiv hosts the administration of Kosiv urban hromada, one of the hromadas of Ukraine. Population:  Its distinctive ceramics were inscribed to UNESCO's Intangible Cultural Heritage List in 2021.

Names
From 1918 to 1945, the town, which at that time was part of the Second Polish Republic, was officially called Kosów Huculski.

History

Initially, a small Hutsul settlement with the remnants of a small castle destroyed by the Turks, Kosiv was founded on the Ribnica (river). The first written mention of it is in the Grant Charter of Lithuanian Duke Svitrigaila, on September 31, 1424. At that time, the village was in the territory of what is today Old Kosiv. In 1565, not far from modern-day Kosiv, Starosta of Sniatyn, Tenczynski founded a town named Rukiv (Polish: Rukow). Polish Crown Hetman Jerzy Jazlowiecki, the owner of Kuty, later destroyed it. Some years later, the town was recovered and named Kosiv (the earlier village of this name thus became Old Kosiv). Until 1772, Kosiv/Kosów was under Polish control.

As a result of the first of Partitions of Poland (Treaty of St. Petersburg dated 5 July 1772), Kosiv was attributed to the Habsburg Empire, as part of Austrian Galicia.

Since 1867, Kosiv was the administrative center of the Kossow Bezirkshauptmannschaft (Austrian name of the district). In 1919, after the Great War, the area returned to Poland and was turned into a powiat seat within the Stanisławów Voivodship. In the Second Polish Republic, Kosów emerged as one of the most popular spas. The Kosów spa was founded in 1891 by doctor Apolinary Tarnawski. Here, in 1911, one of the first units of the Polish Scouting and Guiding Association was created by Kazimierz and Witold Lutosławski, and Olga Drohnowska. Kosów Huculski, as it was called, attracted top names of the interbellum Poland. The spa was visited, among others, by Roman Dmowski, Ignacy Daszynski, Wojciech Korfanty, Gabriela Zapolska, Juliusz Osterwa, Maria Dabrowska, Melchior Wankowicz, Xawery Dunikowski, Karol Adwentowicz, Leon Schiller, Stanisław Dygat, Jozef Pankiewicz, and Lucjan Rydel.

In 1939, Kosów Huculski became part of the Union of Soviet Socialist Republics (USSR) as a result of the Molotov–Ribbentrop Pact and the Invasion of Poland. Here, in September 1939, the government of Poland crossed the Romanian border. Despite this pact, Kosiv was occupied by Nazi Germany from July 1, 1941, until April 2, 1944. After that time it was, again, a member of the Soviet Union, until the independence of Ukraine in 1991.

At the beginning of World War II, around 3700 Jews lived in Kosiv.  In October, 1941, the German security police, leading on Pidzamche street to the so-called "Town Mountain", rounded up and shot more than 2000 Jews, burning them in mass grave.  In April 1942, the authorities forced 1000 Jews to move to Kolomyja, though some returned to Kosiv.    In September, most of the remaining Jews in Kosiv were rounded up.  Some were shot in Kosiv, 500 were sent to prison, and the rest sent to Kolomyja and from there to Belzec where they were immediately murdered.   In October and November, the Jews left behind and in hiding were murdered in Kosiv.  About 100 Kosiv Jews survived, some hiding with sympathetic local inhabitants, others by fleeing the area.

The distinctive painted ceramics from Kosiv originated in the 1700s and reflect the history and culture of  Hutsul people. They were inscribed to UNESCO's list of Intangible Cultural Heritage in 2021.

Location 
Local orientation

Regional orientation

Today, the town of Kosiv borders on the towns and villages of Babyn, Horod, Smodna, Cherhanivka, Staryi Kosiv, Verbovets and Pistyn. The distance from the railroad station in Vizhnytsa is 12 kilometers, from Zabolotiv is 25 kilometers and from Kolomyia — 35 kilometers. Roads with all neighbouring districts connect the city. The total length of roads is 362 kilometers. 160 kilometers of these roads are paved.

People 
 Ivan Andreikanich - sculptor
 Natalka Andrusiv - Ukrainian opera singer
 Volodymyr Blavackiy - Ukrainian actor, director
 Vasyl Bovych -master wood carver
 Menachem Mendel Hager - Hasidic rebbe
 Ostap Havrysch - Ukrainian composer
 Mykhailo Horboviy - painter, master wood carver
 Bogdana Matsotska — Ukrainian Olympic skier
 Volodymyr Kovalyuk — professional Ukrainian soccer player
 Myroslav Laiuk — writer
 Julian Jaworski – Polish scientist, deputy mayor of Kraków, deputy to the Sejm in 1961 – 1965
 Kazimierz Moklowski – Polish architect
 Tadeusz Moklowski – Polish chemist
 Illia Mykhavchuk – Ukrainian designer

See also 
 Kosov (Hasidic dynasty)
 Kosovo for places with similar names.
 Kosov for places with similar names.

References

External links 
 Kosiv in the Encyclopedia of Ukraine
 Photographs of Jewish sites in Kosiv in the Bezalel Narkiss Index of Jewish Art, the Center for Jewish Art, The Hebrew University of Jerusalem.
 Photographs of Jewish sites in Kosiv in Jewish History in Galicia and Bukovina
 Kosiv
Kosow Jewish Cemetery documented at Jewish Galicia and Bukovina ORG

 
Cities in Ivano-Frankivsk Oblast
Kingdom of Galicia and Lodomeria
Stanisławów Voivodeship
Shtetls
Cities of district significance in Ukraine
Holocaust locations in Ukraine